Hilarion Adolphe "Louis" Letourneau (1868? – April 29, 1952) was an ice hockey team owner of the Montreal Canadiens hockey team.

When George Kennedy, Montreal Canadiens owner, died in October 1921, Letourneau, Leo Dandurand and Joseph Cattarinich bought the team for $11,000. This trio was affectionately referred to as the "Three Musketeers" of hockey owners. He left the team after 1930 Stanley Cup win. Letourneau retained his share of the ownership until he sold it in 1932.
His name is on Stanley Cup with Montreal Canadiens in 1924 & 1930
He died April 29, 1952, at the age of 84.

References 

1868 births
1952 deaths
Montreal Canadiens executives